Withrow is an unincorporated community in Douglas County, Washington, United States.

Named for a cattleman named J.J. Withrow, Withrow lies at the base of the Withrow Moraine and Jameson Lake Drumlin Field is a National Park Service designated privately owned National Natural Landmark located in Douglas County, Washington state, United States. Withrow Moraine is the only Ice Age terminal moraine on the Waterville Plateau section of the Columbia Plateau. It lies on the terminal moraine for the Okanogan lobe of the Cordilleran Ice Sheet, which flowed southward through the Okanogan trough from the Interior Plateau of British Columbia blocking the course of the Columbia River and ending on the elevations of the Waterville Plateau.

References

Unincorporated communities in Washington (state)
Unincorporated communities in Douglas County, Washington
Wenatchee–East Wenatchee metropolitan area